Flisa is the administrative centre of Åsnes Municipality in Innlandet county, Norway. The village lies at the confluence of the rivers Flisa and Glomma. The Norwegian National Road 2 and the Solørbanen railway line both pass through the village.

Despite its low population, Flisa is a commercial centre and it has a variety of diverse shops that are located along the town's main street, Kaffegata.

For some time the log driver statue was the town's only landmark. In recent years however, other attractions have opened such as the world's tallest toothpick since Norway's largest producer of toothpicks is located nearby. In 2003, the Flisa Bridge opened, crossing the Glomma just south of the village.

In the summer, Flisa is plagued with mosquitoes. They are quite famous in Åsnes and are usually referred to as Flisa Mygg which translates to "Flisa Mosquitoes".

The tropical house DJ and producer Matoma is from Flisa.

Climate

References

Åsnes
Villages in Innlandet